The Blue Ridge Swim Club is a historic swimming club facility at 1275 Owensville Road in Ivy, Virginia. The property includes a swimming pool that was built in 1913, when the area was developed as part of the Blue Ridge Camp for boys. The pool's water is supplied from Ivy Brook via a gravity feed system. The pool is one of the oldest outdoor recreational facilities in the state.

The property was listed on the National Register of Historic Places in 2015, primarily for the significance of its swimming pool.

See also
National Register of Historic Places listings in Albemarle County, Virginia

References

Buildings and structures in Albemarle County, Virginia
National Register of Historic Places in Albemarle County, Virginia
Swimming clubs